The HESA Hamaseh is an Iranian tactical and reconnaissance unmanned aerial vehicle (UAV) with high flight endurance built by Iran Aircraft Manufacturing Industrial Company (HESA). The Hamaseh was unveiled in 2013 and entered service in 2016.

Design 
The Hamaseh is a single engine, twin-boom UAV. The UAV features a bulbous forward radome; this was later reduced in size as the UAV was developed. The Hamaseh entered service with Iran in 2016.

The Hamaseh can carry up to 185 kg of fuel, equipment, and payload, and has an endurance of up to 11 hours depending on configuration. It is launched via runway takeoff or JATO, and is recovered by runway landing or, in emergencies, a parachute. The Hamaseh can follow pre-determined waypoints to control its flight. Its powerplant is unknown.

The Hamaseh can carry synthetic aperture radar, radar or communications jammers, and a camera. For weapons, it can carry small bombs, grenades, or rockets.

Operational history 

The Hamaseh drone was unveiled on 9 May 2013. Ahmad Vahidi, Iran's defense minister, claimed the drone "with its stealth quality can avoid detection by the enemy." The Hamaseh was also claimed to be a High-Altitude Long Endurance (HALE) platform, despite being a tactical UAV. The Hamaseh at its unveiling ceremony was "equipped" with what appeared to be munitions, but they were physically bolted to the wings, not mounted on hardpoints.

The Hamaseh was first used during military exercises by the IRGC Ground Forces in April 2016. 

In 2017 HESA offered the Hamaseh for export.

Operators

 Islamic Revolutionary Guard Corps

Specifications

References

 

 

Unmanned military aircraft of Iran
Iranian military aircraft
Aircraft manufactured in Iran
Islamic Republic of Iran Air Force
Post–Cold War military equipment of Iran
Unmanned aerial vehicles of Iran